The 18th Daytime Emmy Awards were held on Thursday, June 27, 1991, on CBS, to commemorate excellence in American daytime programming from the previous year (1990). The awards were hosted by The Price Is Right host Bob Barker. For the first time, they aired in the evening, from 9 to 11 p.m. EST.

Outstanding Drama Series
All My Children
As the World Turns
Guiding Light
The Young and the Restless

Outstanding Lead Actor
Peter Bergman (Jack Abbott, The Young and the Restless)
David Canary (Adam Chandler & Stuart Chandler, All My Children)
Nicolas Coster (Lionel Lockridge, Santa Barbara)
A Martinez (Cruz Castillo, Santa Barbara)
James Reynolds (Henry Marshall, Generations)

Outstanding Lead Actress
Julia Barr (Brooke English, All My Children)
Jeanne Cooper (Katherine Chancellor, The Young and the Restless)
Elizabeth Hubbard (Lucinda Walsh, As the World Turns)
Finola Hughes (Anna Devane, General Hospital)
Susan Lucci (Erica Kane, All My Children)

Outstanding Supporting Actor
Bernie Barrow (Louie Slavinski, Loving)
William Christian (Derek Frye, All My Children)
Stuart Damon (Alan Quartermaine, General Hospital)
William Roerick (Henry Chamberlain, Guiding Light)
Kin Shriner (Scott Baldwin, General Hospital)
Jerry verDorn (Ross Marler, Guiding Light)

Outstanding Supporting Actress
Darlene Conley (Sally Spectra, The Bold and the Beautiful)
Maureen Garrett (Holly Reade, Guiding Light)
Jill Larson (Opal Cortlandt, All My Children)
Jess Walton (Jill Abbott, The Young and the Restless)
Kathleen Widdoes (Emma Snyder, As the World Turns)

Outstanding Younger Actor
Bryan Buffington (Bill Lewis III, Guiding Light)
Justin Gocke (Brandon Capwell, Santa Barbara)
Rick Hearst (Alan-Michael Spaulding, Guiding Light)
Andrew Kavovit (Paul Ryan, As the World Turns)
Kristoff St. John (Adam Marshall, Generations)

Outstanding Younger Actress
Tricia Cast (Nina Webster, The Young and the Restless)
Anne Heche (Marley Hudson & Vicky Hudson, Another World)
Kimberly McCullough (Robin Scorpio, General Hospital)
Ashley Peldon (Marah Lewis, Guiding Light)
Charlotte Ross (Eve Donovan, Days of Our Lives)

Outstanding Drama Series Writing Team
All My Children
As the World Turns
Santa Barbara
The Young and the Restless

Outstanding Drama Series Directing Team
All My Children
Guiding Light
Santa Barbara
The Young and the Restless

Outstanding Animated Program
Steven Spielberg, Tom Ruegger, Ken Boyer, Art Leonardi, Art Vitello, Paul Dini, and Sherri Stoner (Tiny Toon Adventures)
Howie Mandel, Tom Tataranowicz, Bernard Wolf, Jim Staahl, Jack Heiter, John Callas, Mitch Schauer, Jim Fisher, Diane Dixon, Michael Wolf, and Phil Roman (Bobby's World)
Cassandra Schafhausen, Nicholas Boxer, Andy Heyward, Larry Houston, Will Meugniot, Barbara Y.E. Pyle, Robby London, Thom Beers, Reed Shelly, Bruce Shelly, and Jim Duffy (Captain Planet and the Planeteers)
Michael C. Gross, Robby London, Andy Heyward, Joe Medjuck, Len Janson, Chuck Menville, Will Meugniot, and Stan Phillips (Slimer! And the Real Ghostbusters)
Sharman Divono, Jeff Hall, Tom Ray, Phil Roman, Mark Evanier, Bob Curtis, and Bob Nesler (Garfield and Friends)

Outstanding Music Direction and Composition
William Ross (Tiny Toon Adventures - "Fields of Honey")
Johnny Costa (Mister Rogers' Neighborhood)
Stephen James Taylor (Brother Future)
Glenn A. Jordan, George S. Clinton, and Mark Mothersbaugh (Pee-wee's Playhouse)

Outstanding Original Song
Bruce Broughton (Music & Lyrics), Wayne Kaatz (lyrics), and Tom Ruegger (lyrics) - "Main title Theme". (Tiny Toon Adventures)
A.J. Gundell - "Love Like This". (Guiding Light)
Steve Dorff, and Gloria Sklerov - "If This Isn't Love". (As the World Turns) 
Dominic Messinger (Music & Lyrics), Roxanne Seeman (Music & Lyrics), and Billie Hughes (Lyrics) (Santa Barbara)

References 

018
Daytime Emmy Awards